The inaugural Southern Five-Hundred (Southern 500 since 1951) was an automobile race held at Darlington Raceway in Darlington, South Carolina on September 4, 1950, as part of the 1950 NASCAR Grand National. While the 1950 race was co-sanctioned by NASCAR and its rival Central States Racing Association, all subsequent Southern 500 races were hosted exclusively by NASCAR.  

It is NASCAR's first 500-mile race, and still holds status as one of NASCAR's premier events. Since there had never been a 500-mile stock car race and Darlington was NASCAR’s first superspeedway, drivers and teams came to the event with unique strategies. Darlington set the precedent for race strategies to come at tracks like the Daytona International Speedway and Talladega Superspeedway.

Background
The track at the time was a four-turn  oval. The track's first two turns are banked at twenty-five degrees, while the final two are banked two degrees lower at twenty-three degrees. The front stretch (the location of the finish line) and the backstretch is banked at six degrees.

Harold Brasington was a retired racer in 1948, who had gotten to know Bill France, Sr. while competing against France at the Daytona Beach Road Course and other dirt tracks in the Southeast and Midwestern United States. He began planning a new speedway after he noticed the huge crowds while attending the 1948 Indianapolis 500 and thought, "If Tony Hulman can do it here, I can do it back home." Brasington bought 70 acres from farmer Sherman Ramsey and started making a race track from a cotton and peanut field. However, he was forced to create an egg-shaped oval with one corner tighter, narrower, and more steeply banked because he promised Ramsey that the new track would not disturb Ramsey's minnow pond at the west side of the property. Brasington was able to make the other turn at the east side of the property wide, sweeping, and flat as he wanted. It took almost a year to build the track.

Race report

Historical information
The Interstate Highway System would not begin construction until later in the decade; its heyday and prominence as an "American superhighway" for leisure and business travel did not kick in until the late 1960s when NASCAR first felt the need to expand outside its regional "shell" and into the national stage.

Qualifying 
More than 80 entrants showed up for the race. Brasington used a two-week qualifying scheme and arranged the 75 cars in three rows of 25, similar to the Indianapolis 500. During those two weeks of qualifications, locals could take their cars and try to qualify, unlike today where independent contract drivers used to run the races.

Drivers who failed to qualify for the race were Dorothy Shull, Bill Bennett, Lewis Hawkins, Pap White, Louise Smith, and Pat Sutton. Herb Thomas did qualify for the race beforehand; the car was on the grid until just before the race when it was repossessed, counting as an automatic withdrawal for Thomas.

Pee Wee Martin and Bob Smith retired from professional stock car racing after this event. Byron Beatty, Walt Crawford, P.E. Godfrey, Bill Henson, Pete Keller, Jerry Kempf, Lee Morgan, Dick Soper, and Jack Yardley made their only NASCAR start in this event. Weldon Adams, Roy Bentley, Jack Carr, Gene Comstock, Gene Darragh, John DuBoise, Carson Dyer, Joe Eubanks, Johnny Grubb, J.E. Hardie, Tex Keene, Bub King, Virgil Livengood, Hub McBride, Hershel McGriff, Bill Osborne, Barney Smith, Rollin Smith, Jesse James Taylor, Charles Tidwell, Murrace Walker, Bill Widenhouse and Shorty York began their NASCAR career at this race and established the first generation of stock car drivers.

Analysis
U.S. Senator Strom Thurmond was the official marshal for the 1950 Southern 500.

The top prize for the race was $10,510 ($ when adjusted for inflation) while the lowest prize was $100 ($ when adjusted for inflation) for 72nd-75th place. Seventy-five cars competed in this era of relatively unregulated racing for a total of $25,325 in winnings ($ when adjusted for inflation). It is pretty incredible, especially for this era to see more than 50 cars out of the 75 starters were still running on lap 300 of 400.

Gober Sosebee led the first four laps. Curtis Turner, the polesitter, then led until lap 22 before being wrecked out of the race on lap 275 with a significant amount of roof damage. After Turner lost the lead, Cotton Owens lead for 23 laps. After that, Mantz led to the finish. Mantz had taken advantage of an offer from Firestone to test a tire designed for asphalt stock car racing. While some cars used over 60 tires to go the remainder of the race, Mantz kept increasing his lead and won by over nine laps. The total time of the race was 6 hours, 38 minutes, and 40 seconds. Two cautions lasted thirteen laps. Four hundred laps were done spanning . Most of the known DNFs in the race were caused by crashes, the worst of which involved drivers Tex Keene, Curtis Turner, and Jack Smith all rolling their cars over the course of the race.

For the average car in the race, the tire load unleashed on the tires on the new, paved circuit was too much on the tires, whether it was a Firestone or a random dirt tire. A legend spread around that teams were so desperate to get new tires that they would steal the tires from parking lots and the infield from the spectators. The race is considered to be the first "tire disaster" in NASCAR history, with the next major tire disaster being the 1969 Talladega 500.

Results

Finishing order
Section reference:

Timeline
Section reference:
 Start of race: Gober Sosebee officially started the race with the pole position.
 Lap 5: Curtis Turner took over the lead from Gober Sosebee.
 Lap 24: Roscoe Thompson overheated his vehicle, making him the last-place finisher.
 Lap 27: Cotton Owens took over the lead from Curtis Turner.
 Lap 50: Johnny Mantz took over the lead from Cotton Owens.
 Lap 52: Jack Carr's vehicle overheated while he was racing.
 Lap 89: Jack Yardley failed to finish the race.
 Lap 98: Alton Haddock failed to finish the race.
 Lap 112: Lloyd Moore failed to finish the race.
 Lap 155: Kenneth Wagner failed to finish the race.
 Lap 176: Buck Baker had a terminal crash, forcing him to retire from the event.
 Lap 188: Gayle Warner failed to finish the race.
 Lap 200: Bill Henson failed to finish the race.
 Lap 208: Rollin Smith failed to finish the race.
 Lap 219: Clyde Minter failed to finish the race.
 Lap 229: Tex Keene had a terminal crash, forcing him to retire from the event.
 Lap 230: Marshall Teague failed to finish the race.
 Lap 238: Tommy Thompson failed to finish the race.
 Lap 249: Bob Apperson failed to finish the race.
 Lap 278: P.E. Godfrey failed to finish the race.
 Lap 281: Pete Keller failed to finish the race.
 Lap 282: Dick Soper failed to finish the race.
 Lap 284: Al Keller failed to finish the race.
 Lap 320: Curtis Turner had a terminal crash after leading 22 laps, forcing him to retire from the event.
 Lap 331: Jimmy Florian had a problem with his vehicle's spindle, knocking him out of the race.
 Lap 332: Jimmy Thompson managed to overheat his vehicle's engine.
 Lap 333: Glenn Dunaway finished well behind the lead lap drivers, his standing wasn't fully recorded.
 Lap 334: Harold Kite finished well behind the lead lap drivers, his standing wasn't fully recorded.
 Lap 340: Slick Smith finished well behind the lead lap drivers, his standing wasn't fully recorded.
 Lap 341: Hub McBride finished well behind the lead lap drivers, his standing wasn't fully recorded.
 Lap 344: Pee Wee Martin managed to overheat his vehicle while he was racing.
 Lap 345: Jack Smith had a terminal crash, forcing him to retire from the event.
 Lap 346: Fonty Flock finished well behind the lead lap drivers, his standing wasn't fully recorded.
 Lap 350: Bill Widenhouse finished well behind the lead lap drivers, his standing wasn't fully recorded.
 Lap 351: Byron Beaty finished well behind the lead lap drivers, his standing wasn't fully recorded.
 Lap 354: Jack White finished well behind the lead lap drivers, his standing wasn't fully recorded.
 Lap 355: Gene Comstock finished well behind the lead lap drivers, his standing wasn't fully recorded.
 Finish: Johnny Mantz was officially declared the winner of the event.

References

Southern 500
Southern 500
NASCAR races at Darlington Raceway